Philippine Amann (10 March 1905 – 2 or 3 August 1990), known professionally as Betty Amann, was a German-American film actress. Born to American parents in Germany, she began her acting career in the United States with the film The Kick-Off (1926). She is perhaps best known for her role in Asphalt (1929).

Early years
Philippine Amann was born in 1905 (some sources say 1906 or 1907) in Pirmasens to a Swiss-German Lutheran family. She has also been referred to as Jewish. Raised in America, Amann studied painting at the National Academy School of Fine Arts in New York; she had been an intent lover of art and painting since childhood.

Career 

Amann acted in small parts at the May Palace Theater before making her screen debut in The Kick-Off (1926), credited as Bee Amann. She next appeared in seven Mack Sennett short comedies, including The Campus Vamp (1928), which also featured a pre-Hollywood fame Carole Lombard.

Her first major film role was in the western Trail of the Horse Thieves (1929). In 1928, she traveled to Germany, where she met Erich Pommer and Joe May, who picked her for the female lead in Asphalt (1929). It was Pommer who gave Amann the pseudonym Betty. She remained in Germany, where she next starred in The Convict from Istanbul (1929) with Heinrich George and Paul Hörbiger. The newspaper Vossische Zeitung wrote of her role in the film, "She was not at all born to portray unexperienced, middle-class girls".

She followed up with The White Devil, and traveled to Poland, where she appeared in Niebezpieczny romans (1930), which was her last silent film.

Her talkie debut was in The Great Longing (1930), which she appeared in as herself. Her following speaking parts included a millionaire's daughter in Oh Those Glorious Old Student Days (1930), as well as an alluring stranger who turns out to be a murderess in Carl Froelich's crime film Hans in Every Street (1930).

In 1931, she traveled to England, where she appeared in Alfred Hitchcock's Rich and Strange (1931), as well as an array of comedies. Back in Germany, she starred in The Big Bluff, Die kleine Schwindlerin, and Tugboat M 17, in which she portrayed a prostitute and thief who seduces a family man.

Upon the rise of Nazism, Amann emigrated to England. She married David B. Stillman in 1938 and returned to America for the final time. Her final film role was as a harbor prostitute in Edgar G. Ulmer's treasure hunter movie Isle of Forgotten Sins (1943).

In 1987, Amann received the German award Filmband in Gold for her long and outstanding work and performance for the German film. Uta Berg-Ganschow wrote of her, "Her eyes are the mirror of other people's wishes. That's what makes them attractive – they're brazen. These eyes do not reveal anything, they merely attract looks. Men are quick to jump upon these wishes: the calculated tear, the teetering bow above her bottom, her curls. All this is banished into the world of the demimonde. But why would the viewers care into what kind of social figure their fantasy is transformed? […] Instead of becoming the picture of fallen morality, Betty Amann becomes the picture of self-assured transgression."

Personal life and death
Amann was married to David B. Stillman until his death in April 1963.

Amann died of Alzheimers on 2 or 3 August 1990. She was cremated at Ferncliff Crematorium in Hartsdale, New York on 4 August 1990 and buried at Willowbrook Cemetery in Westport, Connecticut on 23 May 1991.

Filmography

References

External links

 Betty Amann at the Collector's Homepage Autographs
Photos of Betty Amann

1905 births
1990 deaths
People from Pirmasens
People from the Palatinate (region)
German emigrants to the United States
Jewish German actresses
American people of German-Jewish descent
American film actresses
American silent film actresses
German film actresses
German silent film actresses
20th-century German actresses
20th-century American actresses